Year 1472 (MCDLXXII) was a leap year starting on Wednesday (link will display the full calendar) of the Julian calendar.

Events 
 January–December 
 February 20 – Orkney and Shetland are returned by Norway to Scotland, as a result of a defaulted dowry payment.
 March 4 – A mount of piety is established in Siena (Italy), origin of Banca Monte dei Paschi di Siena, the world's oldest surviving retail bank.
 April 11 – The first printed edition of Dante Alighieri's Divine Comedy is published in Foligno.
 June
 20-year-old Leonardo da Vinci is admitted as a master in his own right to the artists' Guild of Saint Luke in Florence.
 (approximate date) – Volterra, a town in Italy, is sacked by Florentine soldiers for challenging the power of Lorenzo de' Medici.
 July 3 – The Cathedral and Metropolitical Church of Saint Peter in York, England, commonly known as York Minster, is declared complete and consecrated.
 December 31 – The city council of Amsterdam prohibits snowball fights: "Neymant en moet met sneecluyten werpen nocht maecht noch wijf noch manspersoon." ("No one shall throw with snowballs, neither men nor (unmarried) women.")

 Undated 
 The Kingdom of Fez is founded by the Wattasid dynasty with Sultan Abu Abd Allah al-Sheikh Muhammad ibn Yahya as its first ruler.
 An extensive slave trade begins in modern Cameroon as the Portuguese sail up the Wouri River.
 Fernão do Po claims the central-African islands Bioko and Annobón for Portugal.
 Possible discovery of the island of "Bacalao" (perhaps Newfoundland off North America) by João Vaz Corte-Real.
 First printing of Thomas à Kempis' The Imitation of Christ (De Imitatione Christi) probably concludes posthumously in Augsburg; it will reach 100 editions and translations by the end of the century.
 Johannes de Sacrobosco's De sphaera mundi (written c. 1230) is first published in Ferrara, the first printed astronomical book.
 Pietro d'Abano's medical texts Conciliator differentiarum quae inter philosophos et medicos versantur and De venenis eorumque remediis (written before 1315) are first published.

Births 
 January 17 – Guidobaldo da Montefeltro, Italian condottiero and Duke of Urbino (d. 1508)
 February 15 – Piero di Lorenzo de' Medici, ruler of Florence (d. 1503)
 March 28 – Fra Bartolomeo, Italian artist (d. 1517)
 April 5 – Bianca Maria Sforza, Pavian-born Holy Roman Empress as consort to Maximilian I, Holy Roman Emperor (d. 1510)
 April 10 – Margaret of York, English princess (d. 1472)
 May 31 – Érard de La Marck, prince-bishop of Liège (d. 1538)
 August 11 – Nikolaus von Schönberg, German Catholic cardinal (d. 1537)
 October 19 – John Louis, Count of Nassau-Saarbrücken (d. 1545)
 October 31 – Wang Yangming, Chinese Neo-Confucian scholar (d. 1529)
 November 24 – Pietro Torrigiano, Italian sculptor of the Florentine school (d. 1528)
 December 10 – Anne de Mowbray, 8th Countess of Norfolk (d. 1481)
 date unknown 
 Lucas Cranach the Elder, German painter (d. 1553)
 Alfonsina Orsini, Regent of Florence (d. 1520)
 Barbro Stigsdotter, Swedish noblewoman and heroine (d. 1528)

Deaths 
 March 30 – Amadeus IX, Duke of Savoy (b. 1435)
 April 25 – Leon Battista Alberti, Italian painter, poet and philosopher (b. 1404)
 May 24 – Charles de Valois, Duke de Berry, French noble (b. 1446)
 May 30 – Jacquetta of Luxembourg, English duchess, daughter of Pierre de Luxembourg (b. 1416)
 June 4 – Nezahualcoyotl, Aztec poet (b. 1402)
 July 15 – Johann II of Nassau-Saarbrücken, Count of Nassau-Saarbrücken (1429–1472) (b. 1423)
 July 25 – Charles of Artois, Count of Eu, French military leader (b. 1394)
 November 18 – Basilios Bessarion, Latin Patriarch of Constantinople (b. 1403)
 December 11 – Margaret of York, English princess (b. 1472)
 date unknown – Afanasy Nikitin, Russian traveller
 probable 
 Thomas Boyd, Earl of Arran
 Hayne van Ghizeghem, Flemish composer (b. c. 1445)
 Michelozzo, Italian architect and sculptor (b. c. 1396)

References